Antipoaching is an anti-competitive conduct where companies conspire not to hire each other's employees.

Antipoaching agreements, or no-poach agreements, are related to non-compete clauses, but distinct -- no-poach agreements are among employers, non-compete clauses are between employer and company. In the United States, antipoaching agreements have been widespread among franchise businesses: Research has found that 58 percent of major franchisors' contracts in 2016, including those of McDonald's, Burger King, Jiffy Lube, and H&R Block, contained agreements not to hire the workers of other franchisees. Some franchisors have since stated that they would drop those agreements.

Antipoaching agreements may be illegal under U.S. antitrust law in some circumstances. Allegations about such agreements among major high-tech companies, including Apple and Google, were the basis of the High-Tech Employee Antitrust Litigation.

See also 
 High-Tech Employee Antitrust Litigation
 Employee raiding

Notes 

Anti-competitive practices